Elmo Hope Trio is an album by jazz pianist Elmo Hope recorded in 1959 and originally released on the Hifijazz label but rereleased on Contemporary Records.

Reception

The AllMusic review by Scott Yanow stated "The boppish and fairly original Elmo Hope performs seven of his obscure originals, many of which are well worth reviving... Bop and straight-ahead jazz fans wanting to hear a talented pianist play fresh tunes should explore Elmo Hope's valuable music."

Track listing
All compositions by Elmo Hope except as indicated
 "B's A-Plenty" – 5:47   
 "Barfly" – 6:18   
 "Eejah" – 3:55   
 "Boa" – 6:00   
 "Something for Kenny" – 6:29   
 "Like Someone in Love" (Johnny Burke, Jimmy Van Heusen) – 7:32   
 "Minor Bertha" – 4:51   
 "Tranquility" – 2:58

Personnel 
Elmo Hope – piano
Jimmy Bond – bass
Frank Butler – drums

References 

1960 albums
Contemporary Records albums
Elmo Hope albums